Joakim Reinhold Sandell (born 1975) is a Swedish politician, journalist and member of the Riksdag, the national legislature. A member of the Social Democratic Party, he has represented Malmö Municipality since September 2018.

Sandell is the son of mason Bengt-Göran Sandell and crown inspector Ingerd Sandell (née Eklundh). He was educated in Växjö. He studied at Linnaeus University, Lund University and Malmö University. He was a teacher in Ystad. He was a member of the regional council in Skåne County from 2014 to 2018.

References

1975 births
Living people
Members of the Riksdag 2018–2022
Members of the Riksdag 2022–2026
Members of the Riksdag from the Social Democrats
Swedish schoolteachers